Jeff L. Lieberman is a film director, screenwriter and producer of both narrative and documentary films.  He is the founder of Re-Emerging Films and the filmmaker behind The Amazing Nina Simone, Re-Emerging: The Jews of Nigeria and the upcoming films: Bella! and My Harlem.  He is the 2022 winner of The Library of Congress Lavine/Ken Burns Prize for Film

Early life 
Lieberman was born in Vancouver, British Columbia and is a graduate of The Mini School at Prince of Wales Secondary School, Ryerson University’s RTA School of Media, and UCLA's Professional Program in Producing.  Lieberman’s first training in tv/film was through Vancouver’s cult-hit community access TV program, The Complaint Department, which he helped produce for several years while in high school.  He also received theatrical training during a summer at the famed Stagedoor Manor in New York’s Catskill Mountains.

His sister is the Author & Writer, Leanne Lieberman.

Journalism 

During Lieberman’s years in college, both his journalism and production training were further developed as an intern at Business News Network, The Mike Bullard Show, Pearson Television in London, and at KGTV, the ABC Affiliate in San Diego, California.  An internship with CNN brought Lieberman to the network's New York Bureau and working directly with Correspondent Maria Hinojosa and Producer Rose Arce, where during the last month of 1999, they covered stories on the impending Y2K technical glitch, the changing demographics of America in the year 2000, and the events surrounding the trials of the 4 NYPD officers charged in the murder of Amadou Diallo.

Lieberman went on to later write, produce and edit news stories at CBS News in New York and The New York Post, where he covered events all over New York and Washington, DC, including the Obama inauguration, The Times Square terrorist attack, New York’s Fashion Week and the 10-year anniversary of the September 11th attacks.  In speaking to LGBT Weekly, he told them: "I’m a journalist at heart and hope that my films invite people to consider situations in different ways and provoke them into action."

Documentary Producing 
From 2002–2008, Lieberman was the Senior Producer of Hurwitz Creative, producing behind-the-scenes documentaries on the making of many top feature films including Ratatouille, The Incredibles, The Chronicles of Narnia, Charlie and The Chocolate Factory, Troy, I, Robot, and The Bucket List.  Lieberman travelled to film sets around the world,  interviewing Hollywood's leading actors, directors, producers and crafts people, producing programs that aired on HBO, Fox, Starz, Discovery Channel, and the DVDs of films from Warner Bros, Disney, 20th Century Fox, Sony Pictures and Lionsgate.

Re-Emerging Films 
Lieberman established Re-Emerging Films in 2007 at the outset of his first documentary feature.  Inspired by Steven Spielberg naming his production company after his first film, Lieberman followed suit and named his company after his first feature: Re-Emerging: The Jews of Nigeria.  Through Re-Emerging Films, Lieberman has produced two feature documentaries, two TV pilots (Beauty Queens, Mario The Magician) and has produced hours of content for Disney, Coca-Cola, Wine Enthusiast Magazine, Elsevier, Marlo Thomas and Showtime’s Homeland.  Lieberman also co-produced the hit viral pro-Obama election video, “Call Your Zeyde”.

The Amazing Nina Simone 
Lieberman has said that he is a longtime fan of Nina Simone, discovering her music while in high-school.  In 2012, Lieberman journeyed to Simone's hometown of Tryon, North Carolina to visit the origins of the famous musician.  It was there that he was introduced to many of the men and women that grew up with Simone (then named Eunice Waymon) and began the journey to reconstruct the story of the often misunderstood singer, songwriter and civil rights activist.  Lieberman interviewed over 50 of Simone's friends, family, band members, lovers, and fellow activists, including Nikki Giovanni, Eric Burdon of The Animals, Chuck Stewart, Billy Vera, Horace Ott, Lester Hyman, Tom Schnabel, Roscoe Dellums, Marie-Christine Dunham Pratt and Sam Waymon, Nina's brother and longtime band member.  The film debuted in cinemas in October 2015 and has since played over 100 theatres in 10 countries, receiving acclaim from The Hollywood Reporter, Jet Magazine, The Seattle Times, Chicago Reader, The Boston Globe, Broadway World  and Blavity, with Richard Brody writing in The New Yorker Magazine that "It’s a story that’s told well in Liz Garbus’s documentary "What Happened, Miss Simone?" and even better in Jeff Lieberman's documentary "The Amazing Nina Simone."

Lieberman on the Nina Simone Casting Controversy 

In March 2015, Lieberman weighed in on the casting of Zoe Saldana as Nina Simone for the separate bio-film, Nina.  In a guest column in The Hollywood Reporter, Lieberman stated that he found the script and trailer of the film to offer an "ugly and inaccurate portrayal. Lieberman stated that the sensationalized script was one of the reasons he made his documentary film, in order to counter the dramatic liberties used in the telling of Simone's story in other films.  The article was also re-published in People Magazine, The Huffington Post, The Root, BET, and Complex.

Re-Emerging: The Jews of Nigeria 
For his first independent feature, Lieberman wrote, directed, produced, filmed and edited the 2013 documentary, Re-Emerging: The Jews of Nigeria.  Lieberman journeyed deep into Nigeria, operating as a one-man crew, meeting a wide swath of Jewish communities throughout small towns and Nigeria's large cities.  The film centers around one young Igbo man named Shmuel, and his quest to find the true Judaism.  The film debuted in 2013, opening at New York's Quad Cinema and in LA at Laemmle Theatres.  It also premiered at film festivals in New York, Washington DC, Boston, Toronto, Vancouver, Israel and Switzerland.  The film qualified for the 2014 Academy Awards, and received acclaim from The New York Times, The Hollywood Reporter, BBC, NPR, Village Voice and Indiewire.  New York’s Amsterdam News called the film "one of the must-see documentaries of 2013".

The film also inspired several aid projects, including a large shipment of Jewish prayerbooks, following a screening of the film at a Long Island synagogue.

My Harlem 
In 2016, Lieberman announced the completion of his first feature screenplay entitled My Harlem, written in response to an anti-gay Harlem church.  Lieberman aimed to bring the real-life events of the summer of 2016 (gentrification, race relations, police brutality, and interracial gay dating) to the forefront and launched a crowd-funding campaign to get others involved - resulting in the film making international news.  Lieberman says he also wrote the film because "I am a gay man who hardly ever sees my life and dreams on film. I want to see a beautiful, romantic love story between two men that is based in reality with the challenges of dating and relationships but without the pitfalls of dramatic gay tragedy."  He has stated that he plans to independently produce the film with shooting to take place in the summer of 2017.

Bella! 
According to IMDB, Lieberman's newest feature documentary is entitled  Bella! and is about the life and political achievements of the groundbreaking feminist, activist and pioneering congresswoman, Bella Abzug.  The film features brand new interviews with Barbra Streisand, Shirley MacLaine, Hillary Clinton, Lily Tomlin, Nancy Pelosi, Gloria Steinem, Maxine Waters, Phil Donahue, Marlo Thomas, Charles Rangel, David Dinkins and Renée Taylor. The film was selected as one of two winners of The Library of Congress Lavine/Ken Burns Prize for Film at an awards ceremony at The Library of Congress in October, 2022.  The award is a finishing grant designed to help filmmakers with completion funding.

Filmography

References

External links
Official Website

1978 births
Living people
Toronto Metropolitan University alumni
Film directors from Vancouver
Writers from Vancouver
Jewish Canadian writers
American film directors
American film producers
American screenwriters
American television journalists
American television producers
University of California, Los Angeles alumni
Jewish Canadian filmmakers